The Upton Clock Tower is a landmark in Upton, Dorset.

History
The clock tower was built to celebrate the new millennium in 2000.

In 2014, a Armistice Day plaque was added to the side of the clock tower.

References

2000 establishments in England
Clock towers in the United Kingdom
Towers in Dorset
Individual clocks in England
Towers completed in 2000